Michael K. Madden (born September 13, 1943, in Estherville, Iowa) is an American politician and a Republican member of the Wyoming House of Representatives representing District 40 since January 2007.

Education
Madden earned his BS from South Dakota State University and his PhD from Iowa State University.

Elections
2012 Madden was unopposed for both the August 21, 2012 Republican Primary, winning with 2,076 votes, and the November 6, 2012 General election, winning with 3,806 votes.
2006 When Republican Representative Doug Osborn retired and left the District 40 seat open, Madden was unopposed for the August 22, 2006 Republican Primary, winning with 1,776 votes, and won the November 7, 2006 General election with 2,210 votes (56.6%) against Independent candidate Richard Tass.
2008 Madden was unopposed for both the August 19, 2008 Republican Primary, winning with 1,989 votes, and the November 4, 2008 General election, winning with 4,305 votes.
2010 Madden won the three-way August 17, 2010 Republican Primary with 2,205 votes (61.0%), setting up a rematch with his 2006 Independent opponent, Richard Tass; Madden won the November 2, 2010 General election with 2,811 votes (62.4%) against Tass.

References

External links
Official page at the Wyoming Legislature
 

1943 births
Living people
Iowa State University alumni
Republican Party members of the Wyoming House of Representatives
People from Estherville, Iowa
People from Buffalo, Wyoming
South Dakota State University alumni
21st-century American politicians